The tribe Cacatuini consists of four whitish, pinkish or greyish genera:

References

 
Bird tribes
Cacatuinae